The yellow-billed cardinal (Paroaria capitata) is a bird species in the tanager family (Thraupidae). It is not very closely related to the cardinals proper (Cardinalidae).

It occurs in Brazil, Paraguay, Bolivia, Uruguay, and northern Argentina and has been introduced on the island of Hawai'i. It breeds in moist shrubland. The yellow-billed cardinal could be easily confused with the red-crested cardinal. The yellow-billed cardinal does not have a crest.

References

External links 
 
 Yellow-billed cardinal videos, photos & sounds on the Internet Bird Collection
 Stamps (for Brazil, Paraguay) with range map
 Yellow-billed cardinal photo gallery VIREO Photo

yellow-billed cardinal
Birds of the Pantanal
Birds of Paraguay
Birds of Argentina
yellow-billed cardinal